Selima Ahmed is a Bangladeshi businessperson and politician. She is the vice chairperson of Nitol-Niloy Group and the founder and president of the Bangladesh Women Chamber of Commerce and Industry. She was elected as member of Parliament from Comilla-2 in 2018. She also served as board member of state-owned Janata Bank Limited and is a former board member of Sonali Bank Limited. In 2014 she received the Oslo Business for Peace Award for her contributions in the Business sector.  She is a Global Ambassador of The International Alliance for Women and former Course Teacher of MBA class in University of Dhaka.

Early life and education 
Selima Ahmad was born to late A. K. M. Fazlul Huq and late Rahima Huq.

Career 
Ahmad is vice chairperson of the Nitol-Niloy Group. This group is one of the reputed business houses and has 26 companies. Of them, six are joint ventures and three are public companies. It has presence in automobiles, cement, paper, real estate, electronics and financial services.

Political career
She was elected as a member of parliament in 2018 from Comilla-2 as a candidate of the Bangladesh Awami League.

Personal life 
Ahmad is married to Abdul Matlub Ahmad, a business leader and former president of Federation of Bangladesh Chambers of Commerce & Industries (FBCCI). They have two sons.

Awards
 Special Recognition Award by the 28th CACCI Conference held in Kuala Lumpur, Malaysia, 2014.
 Oslo Business for Peace Award, 2014
 Jeane J. Kirkpatrick Award by International Republican Institute, United States, 2013

References 

Living people
Bangladeshi women
Bangladeshi businesspeople
People from Dhaka
11th Jatiya Sangsad members
1960 births